José Manuel Abascal Gómez (born 17 March 1958) is a former Spanish 1500 metres runner. He was born in Alceda, Cantabria. In 1982 he got the silver medal at the European Indoor Championship in 1500 m and the bronze medal in the same event at the European Outdoor Championship. He won the bronze medal at the 1984 Summer Olympics. In 1986, he set a personal best of 3:31.13 min but he failed to qualify for the final in 1500 m European Championship. At the 1987 IAAF World Indoor Championships, Abascal also won a silver medal.

Personal bests 
800 metres – 1:49.5 in Madrid  19-07-1980.
1500 metres – 3:31.13 in Barcelona 16-08-1986.
Mile – 3:50.54 in Rome 10-11-1986.
3000 metres – 7:53.51 in A Coruña 4-08-1988.
5000 metres – 13:12.49 in Oslo 04-07-1987.
3000 metres steeple – 8:38.8 in San Sebastián 29-08-1981.

References

External links 
 
 
 
 

1958 births
Living people
Athletes from Cantabria
Spanish male middle-distance runners
Athletes (track and field) at the 1980 Summer Olympics
Athletes (track and field) at the 1984 Summer Olympics
Olympic athletes of Spain
Olympic bronze medalists for Spain
European Athletics Championships medalists
Medalists at the 1984 Summer Olympics
Olympic bronze medalists in athletics (track and field)
Mediterranean Games bronze medalists for Spain
Mediterranean Games medalists in athletics
Athletes (track and field) at the 1983 Mediterranean Games
World Athletics Indoor Championships medalists
20th-century Spanish people